Ognyanovo may refer to the following places in Bulgaria:

Ognyanovo, Blagoevgrad Province
Ognyanovo, Dobrich Province
Ognyanovo, Pazardzhik Province
Ognyanovo, Sofia Province